Amazon Lex is a service for building conversational interfaces into any application using voice and text. It powers the Amazon Alexa virtual assistant. In April 2017, the platform was released to the developer community, and suggested that it could be used for conversational interfaces (chatbots or otherwise) including Web, mobile apps, robots, toys, drones, and more. Amazon already had launched Alexa Voice Services, which developers can use to integrate Alexa into their own devices, like smart speakers, alarm clocks, etc.; however, Lex will not require that end users interact with the Alexa assistant per se, but rather any type of assistant or interface. As of February 2018, users can now define a response for Amazon Lex chatbots directly from the AWS management console.

References

External links

Natural language processing software
Amazon (company)
Software developer communities